"Little Lion Man" is the debut single by English folk rock band Mumford & Sons. It was released as the lead single from their debut studio album, Sigh No More, on 11 August 2009 in the United Kingdom. The song had a positive commercial performance, charting in several countries and peaking within the top twenty in Australia, Belgium (Flanders), Ireland, and New Zealand. It is not given the Parental Advisory warning even though it has explicit lyrics.

Composition
Frontman Marcus Mumford has said about the song:

Commercial performance
"Little Lion Man" debuted on the UK Singles Chart on 20 September 2009 at number 72. The following week the single climbed eleven places to number 61. On 4 October 2009, the single climbed to number 47, before climbing into the Top 40 at a peak of number 24 on its fourth week in the chart. The single fell ten places to number 34 before falling to number 47 on 25 October 2009, meaning it only spent two weeks within the Top 40. The song found its biggest success in Australia, debuting at number 23 in October before eventually reaching a peak of number 3 in February 2010.

In the US, "Little Lion Man" entered the Billboard Hot 100 chart dated 28 August 2010, when it debuted at No. 98. It reached No. 61 but re-entered at No. 45 after a performance at the Grammys. It has sold 2,336,000 digital copies there as of April 2013.

Awards

The single was ranked first in the Triple J Hottest 100 of 2009, an annual music poll run by Australian national radio station Triple J and described as the largest in the world. It would be the last song released by a British act to top the list until 2020, when Glass Animals won with "Heat Waves".

The song was nominated Grammy Award for Best Rock Song at the 13 February 2011.

In October 2011, NME placed it at number 43 on its list "150 Best Tracks of the Past 15 Years".

Track listing
CD single

Charts

Weekly charts

Year-end charts

Decade-end charts

Certifications

See also
List of number-one alternative rock singles of 2010 (U.S.)

References

2009 debut singles
Mumford & Sons songs
Songs written by Marcus Mumford
Song recordings produced by Markus Dravs
Tonight Alive songs
Glassnote Records singles
Island Records singles
2009 songs